Al-Jeezah  is a district number 22 out of 27 in the Amman Governorate of north-western Jordan.

History 
In 634, al-Jizah was inhabited by Arab Christian tribe Kalb. However, they were conquered by Khalid ibn Walid during the Muslim conquest of Mesopotamia at 634.

References

Bibliography

External Links
Photos of Jizah at the American Center of Research

Populated places in Amman Governorate